Ernő Schaller-Baross (born January 30, 1987, Budapest) is a diplomat, Member of the European Parliament (MEP) from Hungary, member of the national-conservative political party, Fidesz.

Education 
He finished his studies at the Austrian High School in Budapest, in 2005. In 2010 he graduated from Károli Gáspár University in Hungary Faculty of Law.

Career 
Source:
 His civil servant career started in 2009 as an intern, who worked for a member of the National Assembly of Hungary.
 Between 2010 and 2013, he worked as a desk officer at the Ministry of Public Administration and Justice of Hungary.
 From 2013 to 2018, he was the Director of International Affairs of the Foundation for a Civic Hungary.
 Between 2017 and 2018, he supported the leader of the Parliamentary Group of Fidesz as a foreign policy advisor.
 Between May 2018 and January 2021, he was the Deputy State Secretary for International Affairs at the Prime Minister's Office of Hungary
 Since 2021, he has been announced by the Fidesz-KDNP as a Member of the European Parliament (MEP)

Areas of expertise

• Digital politics and artificial intelligence

• Small and medium enterprises

• Skills, competencies, mobility

• EU institutional and interinstitutional affairs

• EU external relations 

Professional activity in the European Parliament

Ernő Schaller-Baross took over his mandate as a member of the European Parliament in January 2021. He began his career as a full member of the Committee on Legal Affairs (JURI) and the Committee on Employment and Social Affairs (EMPL), and as a substitute member of the Delegation for relations with the United States of America.

In the Committee on Legal Affairs, he was directly dealing with the European Parliament's reports on the quality of EU legislation, focusing on proposals that would prevent the EU institutions from overextension and allow Member States to be more closely involved in monitoring subsidiarity and proportionality of EU legislation.

In the area of digital policy, he emphasized the need for transparency, the rule of law and the need for political neutrality with regard to the operation of technology giants.

In September 2021, as non-attached Member of the European Parliament, he became full member of the Special Committee on Artificial Intelligence (AIDA) and substitute member of the Committee on Industry, Research and Energy (ITRE). In his work in the field of artificial intelligence, he is currently examining the future impact of intelligence on the EU economy, in particular in areas such as employment, education or health, and legal and ethical issues. Representing the interests of small and medium-sized enterprises in particular, and especially Hungarian companies, he works in close co-operation with them, focusing on the competitiveness of European companies and objectives set in the Artificial Intelligence Strategy of Hungary.

Since January 2022 Ernő Schaller-Baross is a member of the Committee on International Trade (INTA), which plays a decisive role in the definition of the Union's trade policy. The role of INTA is to evaluate all EU trade and investment agreements, scrutinise the Commission's work before the start of and during negotiations and co-decide on the legal framework related to international trade given that trade agreements and legal acts can only enter into force with the consent of the European Parliament. The Committee also leads the debate about the future direction of international trade and investments. 

As a member of the Committee, he plays an active role, primarily in the interests of European companies, especially small and medium-sized enterprises so that they can maintain and increase their competitiveness within the EU and as global players in the international market.

Other information 

 2020 - Ministerial Commissioner at the Prime Minister's Office of Hungary
 2020 - Board member of the Hungarian Golf Federation
 In 2019, he participated in the James S. Denton Transatlantic Fellowship organised by the Center for European Policy Analysis (CEPA) in Washington, D.C.
 In autumn 2020, he was a participant in the International Visitor Leadership Program (IVLP) organised by the U.S. Department of State
 2019 - member of the Supervisory Board of the Otto Habsburg Foundation
 2012-2014 vice president of the Young Christian Democratic Union
 2010 - member of the national-conservative, political party, Fidesz

References

External links 
Official site of the Hungarian Government
Ernő Schaller-Baross at The European Parliament

1987 births
Living people
Fidesz MEPs
MEPs for Hungary 2019–2024
Politicians from Budapest
Hungarian jurists